Zaca may refer to:

Huehue Zaca, a 15th-century Aztec noble and a warrior
The Zaca Fire, the second largest wildfire in modern California history
Zaca Creek, an American country music group
Zaca Creek, a tributary of the Santa Ynez River
Zaca Oil Field, along Zaca Creek
Two U.S. Navy ships named 

ca:Zaca